Anders Erik Carlberg (8 July 1943 – 5 January 2013) was a Swedish socialist politician, social worker and writer.

Life 
Anders Carlberg was born in Stockholm, Sweden, in 1943. He became active in the political left, and was the leader of the Swedish Young communists in 1967–1970. In that capacity, he played a prominent role in the Occupation of the Student Union Building in 1968. In the early 1980s, however, Carlberg became a member of the then-ruling Swedish Social Democratic Party.

In 1984, Carlberg co-founded the Fryshuset, the activity center for young people in Stockholm, Sweden, offering social projects and educational programs. In 2000, Carlberg was awarded H. M. The King's Medal, 8th size, for his social projects and educational programs. Anders Carlberg died in 2013 in Stockholm after a brief illness at the age of 69.

References 

1943 births
2013 deaths
Swedish communists
Swedish social democrats
Politicians from Stockholm